Setaria is a widespread genus of plants in the grass family. The name is derived from the Latin word seta, meaning "bristle" or "hair", which refers to the bristly spikelets.

The genus includes over 100 species distributed in many tropical and temperate regions around the world, and members are commonly known as foxtail or bristle grasses.

Description
The grass is topped by a cylindrical long-haired head, which tend to droop when ripe.

Species
 Currently accepted

 Formerly included
Numerous species were once considered members of Setaria but have since been reassigned to the following genera: Brachiaria, Dissochondrus, Echinochloa, Holcolemma, Ixophorus, Oplismenus, Panicum, Paspalidium, Pennisetum, Pseudoraphis, Setariopsis, and Urochloa

Uses 
The grains can be eaten raw, though are hard and can be bitter; boiling can reduce both of these properties.

Several species have been domesticated and used as staple crops throughout history: foxtail millet (S. italica), korali (S. pumila) in India, and, before the full domestication of maize, Setaria macrostachya in Mexico. Several species are still cultivated today as food or as animal fodder, such as foxtail millet and korali (S. pumila), while others are considered invasive weeds. S. viridis is currently being developed as a genetic model system for bioenergy grasses.

Other species that have been cultivated as crops include S. palmifolia (highland pitpit) of Papua New Guinea, where it is cultivated as a green vegetable; S. parviflora (knot-root foxtail), historically cultivated in Mesoamerica; and S. sphacelata (African bristle grass) of Sudan, a "lost millet" of Nubia.

See also 
 Hendrik de Wit, a botanist who studied Setaria

References

External links
 Setaria. California Department of Food and Agriculture.

 
Poaceae genera
Grasses of Africa
Grasses of Asia
Grasses of Europe
Grasses of North America
Grasses of Oceania
Grasses of South America
Panicoideae
Taxa named by Palisot de Beauvois
Taxonomy articles created by Polbot